Anders Heyerdahl (29 October 1832 – 3 December 1918) was a Norwegian violinist, composer and folk music collector.

He was born in what is today Aurskog-Høland, and was the younger brother of engineer Halvor Emil Heyerdahl. He studied music mainly under Carl Arnold. In addition to his own compositions, he spent the years 1856 to 1861 collecting folk music from Hallingdal and Aurskog. The work was published as Norske Dansar og Slåtter. Heyerdahl also published the local historic work Urskogs Beskrivelse, in 1882.
Great-grandfather of the Norwegian singer Karin Krog and granduncle of Thor Heyerdahl.

References

1832 births
1918 deaths
People from Aurskog-Høland
Norwegian violinists
Male violinists
Norwegian composers
Norwegian male composers